James Fallon (born 24 March 1950) is a Scottish former footballer and manager. He played 619 Scottish Football League matches for Clydebank, going on to manage them and also Dumbarton.

Fallon became manager of Dumbarton in 1995. The club were relegated to the Scottish Second Division in 1996. He resigned in 1996. Fallon won one home game in his fourteen months in charge, overall winning two games.

He was replaced by former player Ian Wallace.

Managerial Statistics 

Stirlingshire Cup games not included.

Honours 
Dumbarton
Stirlingshire Cup: 1995–96

See also
 List of footballers in Scotland by number of league appearances (500+)

References 

 
 

Living people
1950 births
Sportspeople from Cambuslang
Scottish footballers
Scottish football managers
Clydebank F.C. (1965) players
Clydebank F.C. (1965) managers
Dumbarton F.C. managers
Association football central defenders
Scottish Football League players
Scottish Football League managers
Footballers from South Lanarkshire